The Metropolitan Board of Works (MBW) was the upper tier of local government of London's metropolis – it upgraded the infrastucture between 1855 and 1889. Also, it had a parks and open spaces committee which set aside and opened up several landmark parks. The metropolis, which the board served, included substantial parts of Middlesex, Surrey, and Kent throughout the 33 years leading up to the advent of county councils. This urban zone lay around the medieval-sized City of London but plans to enact a similar body in 1837 failed. Parliament finally passed the Metropolis Management Act 1855 which dissolved a short-lived building office and a sewers commission and made the Board effective as of December that year. The board endured until it was succeeded by London County Council, as its directly elected, direct successor, in March 1889.

Its principal responsibility was to provide infrastructure to cope with the rapid growth of the metropolis, which it accomplished with varying degrees of success. The MBW was co-opted from boards, districts of vestries who were elected by their ratepayers rather than directly elected, but which during its period were separated into civil parishes removing many residual Church of England ties.  It was accountable to Parliament but not to a particular ministry to supervise accounts. This democratic deficit vexed journal critics and rate-paying Londoners, especially having grown in budget and been seen as a reliable contract source when some of its members and staff engaged in embezzlement, bribery and breach of fiduciary duty (unfair contract procurement and mismanagement).  However the national proliferation of such a tier of government on its demise recognised the advantages of economies of scale in uniting districts in procuring, improving and maintaining energy, street lighting, fire fighting, sanitation, and transport in the same way as large, well-funded, democratic, ministerially and accounting-regulated Municipal Corporations had widely done since 1835.

Background
The growth of the city around the commercial City of London was continuing apace; as the British Empire grew so the London Docks had grown in trade, population sharply grew and demand for housing rose as did the building of homes.  Half of the population of the two of the three counties that adjoined that medieval-walled city definition were within a few miles of it.  However the government of this metropolis was chaotic, with over 100 key authorities having statutory or customary powers and much overlapping territory. Specifically, providing a rate-paid service or capital improvement in a given place sometimes needed the co-ordination or consent of many of these.

In 1835 elected municipal boroughs had been set up covering every major city except London. The City of London, the very core of the sprawling metropolis which keeps its medieval boundaries, was untouched by the Municipal Corporations Act 1835 and resisted all moves to expand its borders to include the generally poorer districts surrounding it. This meant that commissions (justices) of the peace of three counties,  key landowners, and powerful parish council vestries beneath them, had authority over the clearly urban area, the metropolis: Middlesex north of the Thames and west of the Lea up to several miles from the City, Surrey to the south and south-west, and Kent as to the south east.

In 1837 an attempt was made to set up an elected authority covering the whole of the metropolis; however, the wealthier districts of Marylebone and Westminster resisted this, as some of their own local powers and low rates would have been lost. They defeated the motion. In 1854 the  Royal Commission on the Corporation of the City of London proposed to divide an urban area around the City of London into seven boroughs, each represented on a Metropolitan Board of Works. This proposal was abandoned, but the next year the board of works was set up to cover all this.

Creation

To empower this body to coordinate work to plan and build infrastucture of the metropolis, Parliament passed the Metropolis Management Act 1855 which created the Metropolitan Board of Works (which took over the responsibilities of the short-lived Metropolitan Buildings Office and Metropolitan Commission of Sewers, established in 1845 and 1848 respectively). It covered "the Metropolis", the area designated London in the 1851 census (an enlarged variant of the Bills of mortality area fixed in 1726), the alternative proposals had been the Metropolitan Police District; the coal tax area; or that used for the Metropolitan Interments Act 1852.

It was not to be a directly elected body, but instead to consist of members nominated by the vestries who were the principal local authorities. The larger vestries had two members and the City of London had three. A few vestries were for tiny parishes who co-convened into a district board for nominating members to the MBW. There were 45 members, who would then elect a Chairman who was to become a member ex officio.  The first nominations took place in December and the Board met first on 22 December 1855 where John Thwaites was elected as chairman. The board took over the powers, duties and liabilities of the Commission of Sewers and the Buildings Office on 1 January 1856.

Activities

Sewage

A major problem was sewage: most of London's waste was allowed to flow into the Thames resulting in a horrendous smell in the summer months. In 1855 and 1858 there were especially bad summers with the latter being known as "The Great Stink". A notable achievement of the Board was the creation of the core London sewerage system, including 75 miles (120 km) of main and 1000 miles (1650 km) of street sewers, which solved the problem. A large part of the work of the MBW was under the charge of the Chief Engineer, Joseph Bazalgette, previously engineer with the Metropolitan Commission of Sewers.

Streets and bridges
Activities included slum clearance and making new streets to relieve traffic congestion. The most important streets built were Charing Cross Road, Garrick Street, Southwark Street and Northumberland and Shaftesbury Avenues. 

From 1869 the MBW bought all the private bridges across its section of the Tideway (Thames) and freed them of tolls. It also rebuilt Putney, Battersea, Waterloo and Hammersmith Bridges. 

Commons-tabled plans for a bridge serving the role of Tower Bridge
The board wanted to build a new bridge east of London Bridge, discussed for many years. In 1878 Bazalgette drew up plans which were estimated at £1.25 million. The Treasury refused to help by upping the coal and wine duties (most of the board's income). The MWB advanced its plans, but saw its private bill which included negotiated payments and similar rejected by the House of Commons for lack of headroom for light shipping.

Embankment
The Board funded the tree-studded surface in the three sections of its contractor-designer Joseph Bazalgette's Thames Embankment from 1864.

Fire brigade

From 1865 the MBW became responsible for administering the Metropolitan Fire Brigade. Architects employed by the MBW who specialised in fire stations included Robert Pearsall, responsible for Fulham Fire Station and Woolwich Fire Station.

Parks and open spaces
In 1856 the MBW obtained an amending act of parliament giving them the power to provide "parks, pleasure-grounds and open spaces", subject to parliamentary approval. Among the parks and open spaces acquired or laid by the board were:
Finsbury Park (acquired 1857, formally opened 1869)
Southwark Park (acquired 1864, opened 1869)
Victoria Embankment Gardens (opened in 1870)
Leicester Square (opened in 1874)
Wormwood Scrubs (vested in the MBW in 1879)
Hampstead Heath (acquired in 1886)
Battersea Park, Kennington Park, Victoria Park and the gardens surrounding Bethnal Green Museum (taken over from the Office of Works in 1887)
Clapham Common (transferred to the board's ownership in 1887)
Wandsworth Common (duties of the conservators transferred to the board in 1887)
Ravenscourt Park in 1888 and Clissold Park in 1889
Dulwich Park laid out by the MBW but opened by the successor London County Council in 1890.

Under the Metropolitan Commons Act 1878 the MBW obtained the right to purchase and hold saleable rights in common lands in the Metropolis, in order to preserve the right of public access. The board also purchased the manorial rights in Streatham Common and Tooting Common.

Organisation

The MBW at first had its meetings in the Guildhall of the City of London and its headquarters at Greek Street in Soho. It then built its own headquarters at Spring Gardens (which became a metonym for the MBW), designed by its first chief architect Frederick Marrable and built in an Italianate style in 1859. When John Thwaites died (8 August 1870), he was eventually replaced by James Macnaghten Hogg, later Lord Magheramorne, who remained chairman until the MBW was abolished. There was an increase in the membership to 59 in 1885 when some district boards were divided and others were given more members.

Scandals
Few ratepayers and construction contractors thought MBW were transparently rewarded or that their property deals and tendering amounted to fair price and competition. Its status as a joint board insulated its members from any influence of popular opinion, though all property owners had to pay for its work as part of their local government rates. Worse, the very many building contracts issued by the MBW made membership of it desirable for anyone wishing to bid for them. The MBW took most of its decisions in secret. There were a succession of corruption scandals in the late 1880s, which led to a Royal Commission investigation. By this time, the MBW had the moniker the "Metropolitan Board of Perks".

The knub of the scandal arose from the MBW's purchase of the old Pavilion music hall in Piccadilly Circus in 1879, when the site was thought necessary for the construction of Shaftesbury Avenue. As the street was still in the early stage, the site was leased to music hall proprietor R.E. Villiers. In addition to this, Villiers paid a small sub rosa amount to F.W. Goddard, who was Chief Valuer for the Board, for favourable treatment.

In 1883 Villiers met with Goddard and Thomas James Robertson (MWB Assistant Surveyor) to ensure that the remainder of the site was granted to him for a new Pavilion. They agreed to help him, in return for one corner becoming a public house under the landlordship of W.W. Grey who was the brother of Robertson, though this was not apparent.

In November 1884 Robertson told Villiers that the time had come to make a formal offer to the MBW to rent the new site. Villiers offered £2,700 ground rent per year. The Board instructed its superintending architect, George Vulliamy, to value the site: he was old and left practically all of the work to his subordinates – Goddard and Robertson (it was said by the Deputy Chairman of the Board that "Mr. Goddard and Mr. Robertson were Mr. Vulliamy"). They prepared a report valuing the ground rent at £3,000, which Villiers immediately accepted; this was then hurriedly pushed through the Board which agreed it despite a higher offer of £4,000.  Ground rent was paid £2,650 for the largest part, and £350 for the corner. Goddard continued collecting secret sums from Villiers, and Grey took up the cheap corner plot – he sold his existing public house on Tichborn Street and divided the £10,000 profit between Goddard and Robertson. In December 1886, Villiers sold the Pavilion and gave £5,000 to Goddard.

Subsidiary corruption
For years, vague hints had been made that the Board tended to encourage those applying for leases to employ members of the Board as architects. In particular, James Ebenezer Saunders had been appointed as chief architect on the Pavilion, on the Grand Hotel and Metropole Hotel on Northumberland Avenue, on land owned by the Board did little design and oversight. Francis Hayman Fowler, although he had done much other work as a board member, had taken money from site owners and lessees in circumstances which clearly indicated bribery.

At lowest level, MBW's Assistant Architect, John Hebb, had responsibility for inspecting theatres for safety. He began to write to the managers of theatres with upcoming inspections to suggest that they might want to send him free tickets. Given the power of the board to close theatres, most complied. However, displeased by the inspections themselves, and by the attempt to extract gifts, the managers tended to send Hebb tickets for seats that were at the back of the house or hidden behind a pillar.

Royal Commission
The Goddard-Robertson scandal was revealed by a series of articles in the Financial News beginning on 25 October 1886. The Board itself undertook an incompetent investigation under the Chairmanship of Magheramorne, which found Robertson was "injudicious in allowing relatives to become tenants of the Board without informing the Board" but could not find anything worthy "of more severe censure". Anti-Board campaigners were not pleased and kept up the pressure. On the motion of Lord Randolph Churchill (who represented Paddington South where anti-Board feeling was at its highest), the House of Commons voted on 16 February 1888 to establish a Royal Commission to inquire into the Board.

The commission was headed by Lord Herschell and found the main allegations of the Financial News to have been correct, and indeed understated. Some other scandals were also discovered including the corruption of architects who were members of the Board. However, the Commission repudiated the view of critics that corruption was endemic in the Board.

While the Royal Commission was still preparing its hearings, the President of the Local Government Board Charles Ritchie announced that elected County Councils were to be created throughout the United Kingdom. Without much opposition the Bill had clauses that, on passage into an Act, divorced MBW's ambit from the power-weak Quarter Sessions and other Courts of Surrey, Middlesex and Kent to turn it into a county with an elected London County Council. This matched the aims of anti-Board campaigners, principally the London Municipal Reform League.

Abolition
The Metropolitan Board of Works was abolished by the Local Government Act 1888; and the London County Council had been elected on 21 January 1889, to assume its new powers on 1 April. With the MBW a lame duck, its last weeks were its most inglorious period. The LCC were due to assume financial responsibility; and the MBW began to award large pensions to the retiring officers and large salaries to those who would transfer. The MBW then decided to allow the Samaritan Hospital in Marylebone to use an additional 12 feet of pavement, which the LCC opposed. The LCC wrote to the MBW asking it not to take the decision; the MBW did not reply and gave the permission.

Finally, the MBW received the tenders for the Blackwall Tunnel and decided to take a decision to award the contract at its final meeting. The LCC again wrote asking the MBW to leave the decision to them. The Chairman of the MBW replied (18 March 1889) that it intended to continue. At this the LCC decided to appeal to the government which exercised its power to abolish the MBW and bring the LCC into existence on 21 March 1889.

The magazine Punch printed a cartoon to mark the abolition of the MBW entitled 'Peace to its Hashes', representing the MBW by a black suit of armour (i.e. blackmail). The citation lauded the MBW for showing 'how jobbery may be elevated to the level of the fine arts'.

The MBW's headquarters by Admiralty Arch off The Mall were taken over by LCC until County Hall was complete in 1922.  It was renamed 'Old County Hall' and was a satellite office until the hundred-year lease expired in 1958. It became used for central government and was demolished in 1971, for a new headquarters for the British Council.

Chairmen
 Sir John Thwaites 1855–1870
 James Macnaghten Hogg 1870–1889

See also
List of members of the Metropolitan Board of Works

References

Bibliography
'Professionalism, Patronage and Public Service in Victorian London: The Staff of the Metropolitan Board of Works, 1856–1889' by Gloria Clifton (Athlone Press, London, 1992)
'The Government of Victorian London, 1855–1889: The Metropolitan Board of Works, the Vestries, and the City Corporation' by David Owen (Harvard University Press, Cambridge MA, 1982)

Architectural plans for the Spring Gardens building (CRES 35/2420 and CRES 35/2421) can be found at The National Archives.

 
 
1855 establishments in the United Kingdom
Thames Water